Marco Haller can refer to:

Marco Haller (footballer) (born 1984), German
Marco Haller (cyclist) (born 1991), Austrian